Cyrtinus acunai is a species of beetle in the family Cerambycidae. It was described by Fisher in 1935. It is known from Cuba.

References

Cyrtinini
Beetles described in 1935
Endemic fauna of Cuba